Soboli is a rural locality (a settlement) in Glubokovsky Selsoviet, Zavyalovsky District, Altai Krai, Russia. The population was 108 as of 2013. There are 2 streets.

Geography 
Soboli is located 37 km north of Zavyalovo (the district's administrative centre) by road. Sitnikovo is the nearest rural locality.

References 

Rural localities in Zavyalovsky District, Altai Krai